Greive is a surname. Notable people with the surname include:

Bob Greive (1919–2004), American politician
Bradley Trevor Greive (born 1970), Australian author
Edward Greive (1797–1845), Canadian politician and businessman
Hermann Greive (1935–1984), German professor of Jewish studies
Johan Conrad Greive (1837–1891), Dutch painter
Petrus Franciscus Greive (1811–1872), Dutch painter and lithographer
Tallulah Greive (born 1997), Australian-Scottish actress

See also 
George Grieve (1748–1809), or Greive (as he latterly spelled it), was the persecutor of Madame Du Barry